Kabongo may refer to:

 Kabongo, Democratic Republic of the Congo
 Christian Kabongo (born 1990), Canadian basketball player
 Dieudonné Kabongo (1950–2011), Congolese-born Belgian comedian, humorist, musician and actor
 Emmanuel Kabongo (born 1986), Canadian actor and producer
 Eugène Kabongo (born 1960), Congolese soccer player
 Honore Kabongo (born 1985), Rwandan footballer
 Joel Kabongo (born 1998), Danish footballer
 Mutamba Kabongo (born 1970), Congolese footballer
 Myck Kabongo (born 1992), Canadian basketball player
 Patrick Kabongo (born 1979), Canadian football offensive lineman